Caviinae is a subfamily uniting all living members of the family Caviidae with the exception of the maras, capybaras, and Kerodon.  The subfamily traditionally contained the guinea pig or cavy-like forms along with the cursorially adapted (running) Kerodon.  Molecular results suggest the Caviinae as so defined would be paraphyletic and Kerodon is more closely related to maras and capybaras than to other caviines.  This led Woods and Kilpatrick (2005) to unite Kerodon and capybaras into the subfamily Hydrochoerinae within the Caviidae. These studies also suggest  Microcavia and Cavia are more closely related to one another than either is to Galea.

Genera and species
Subfamily Caviinae
†Cardiomys
†Allocavia
†Palaeocavia
†Neocavia
†Dolicavia
†Macrocavia
†Caviops
†Pascualia
Galea - yellow-toothed cavies
Galea flavidens - Brandt's yellow-toothed cavy (may be an invalid species)
Galea monasteriensis - Muenster yellow-toothed cavy
Galea musteloides - common yellow-toothed cavy
Galea spixii - Spix's yellow-toothed cavy
Microcavia - mountain cavies
Microcavia australis - southern mountain cavy
Microcavia niata - Andean mountain cavy
Microcavia shiptoni - Shipton's mountain cavy
Cavia - guinea pigs
Cavia aperea - Brazilian guinea pig
Cavia fulgida - shiny guinea pig
Cavia intermedia - intermediate guinea pig
Cavia magna - greater guinea pig
Cavia porcellus - domestic guinea pig
Cavia tschudii - montane guinea pig

References

Further reading
Duff, A. and A. Lawson. 2004. Mammals of the World A Checklist. New Haven, Yale University Press.
McKenna, Malcolm C., and Bell, Susan K. 1997. Classification of Mammals Above the Species Level. Columbia University Press, New York, 631 pp.

External links
 

Cavies
Taxa named by Gotthelf Fischer von Waldheim
Mammal subfamilies